Altair: A Record of Battles is a Japanese manga series written and illustrated by Kotono Katō about Tuğril Mahmut, a young military officer and his exploits to protect his country from invasion by a neighboring empire. It was first published in the 9th 2007 issue of the shōnen manga magazine Monthly Shōnen Sirius, published by Kodansha on July 26, 2007. Kodansha's North American subsidiary Kodansha USA announced that it will release the series in English via its digital platform, starting on March 21, 2017.


Volume list

Shōkoku no Altair-san
Monthly Shōnen Sirius also serialized Shiina Soga's , a short, comedic chibi-styled manga from 2012 to 2013, with a total of 21 chapters and released in a single tankōbon volume. On August 26, 2017, a special chapter of Shōkoku no Altair-san was released in the October 2017 issue of the Monthly Shōnen Sirius magazine.

Shōkoku no Altair Kaiden Tōkoku no Subaru
Another spin-off, titled , written by Hirokazu Kobayashi and illustrated by Kotono Kato's sister, Chika Katō's, was serialized in Monthly Shōnen Sirius from January 26, 2016, to April 26, 2019. The set far to the east of Rumeliana, where the more Asian-influence countries exist and takes roughly six months ahead of the main series. The plot focus on the island nation of Kusanagi, which has been annexed by the larger country of Çinili and fallen into ruin. Subaru masquerades as the nation's former prince and tries to leads a rebellion to free her country. Kodansha collected its chapters in seven tankōbon volumes, released from January 17, 2017, to September 9, 2019.

References

Altair: A Record of Battles